The Laughery Creek Bridge is a triple whipple truss bridge on the border of Dearborn County, Indiana, and Ohio County, Indiana. It crosses Laughery Creek. This bridge was built in 1878. The Wrought Iron Bridge Company, a prolific late 19th-century bridge company, constructed the bridge. The bridge is seated on stone abutments. The deck surface is not original and is currently concrete. The bridge, nearly 300 feet in length, is a single span pin connected triple intersection Whipple through truss, and is the only example in the world of this truss type. The name bridge's nickname, "Triple Whipple Bridge" is a play on words. The double-intersection Pratt, which was called the Whipple truss configuration, was a far more common variation of the standard Pratt configuration. Since the Laughery Creek Bridge's members have three intersections instead of two, this gives rise to the "Triple Whipple" name. This bridge was listed on the National Register of Historic Places in 1976.

After closing in the 1970s, the bridge fell into serious disrepair, landing it on Indiana's 10 Most Endangered places list in 1993. A combination of federal funds and matching funds from Dearborn and Ohio Counties allowed the bridge to be refurbished and converted to pedestrian use in 2009.

See also
List of bridges documented by the Historic American Engineering Record in Indiana

References

External links
"Celebrating the Triple Whipple" by the Historic Landmarks Foundation of Indiana, October 30, 2009.
"Triple Whipple Bridge" by Historic Bridges of Michigan and Elsewhere

Historic American Engineering Record in Indiana
Road bridges on the National Register of Historic Places in Indiana
Bridges completed in 1878
National Register of Historic Places in Dearborn County, Indiana
National Register of Historic Places in Ohio County, Indiana
Transportation buildings and structures in Dearborn County, Indiana
Buildings and structures in Ohio County, Indiana
Transportation in Ohio County, Indiana
1868 establishments in Indiana
Wrought iron bridges in the United States
Whipple truss bridges in the United States